Adrian Edqvist (born 20 May 1999) is a Swedish footballer who plays as a forward for Gefle IF.

Youth career
Edqvist was born in Karlskrona and started his career in Nättraby GoIF. At the age of seven, the family moved from Blekinge to the Spanish south coast and Edqvist then started playing in Las Lagunas, outside Málaga. During the years in Spain he entered Andalusia's national team and was close to a move to the La Liga club Málaga CF shortly before the family returned to Sweden. After returning to Sweden, he joined Karlskrona AIF and in 2015 he joined Malmö FF, who won the battle for his signature over Kalmar FF and the Danish club Brøndby IF. In December 2015, he also went on a trial at Stoke City.

Career
In 2017, Edqvist joined Kalmar FF from Malmö FF where he played at his youth years. He was promoted to the first team squad of Kalmar FF in September 2017. On 11 March 2019, Kalmar FF signed a cooperation agreement Oskarshamns AIK and Edqvist alongside his teammate Alexander Ahl Holmström was loaned out to the club on the same day until 30 November 2019. The deal also made it possible to play in both Kalmar's A team and U21 teams while playing for Oskarshamns AIK.

On 12 July 2019, Edqvist was loaned out to Dutch Eerste Divisie club Go Ahead Eagles until June 2020.

On 12 February 2021, he signed a three-year contract with Jönköping. In December 2022, Edqvist joined Gefle IF.

References

External links 
 
 

1999 births
Living people
Swedish footballers
Swedish expatriate footballers
Association football forwards
Sportspeople from Blekinge County
People from Karlskrona
Kalmar FF players
Oskarshamns AIK players
Go Ahead Eagles players
Jönköpings Södra IF players
Gefle IF players
Allsvenskan players
Ettan Fotboll players
Eerste Divisie players
Superettan players
Swedish expatriate sportspeople in the Netherlands
Expatriate footballers in the Netherlands